Hendersin Knob is an ice-covered knob rising between the heads of Craft Glacier and Rochray Glacier in the southwest part of Thurston Island, Antarctica. It was first plotted from air photos taken by U.S. Navy Operation HIGHJUMP, 1946–47, and was named by the Advisory Committee on Antarctic Names for aviation radioman Wendell K. Hendersin, U.S. Navy, a member of the expedition who lost his life in a seaplane crash at Thurston Island on December 30, 1946.

Maps
 Thurston Island – Jones Mountains. 1:500000 Antarctica Sketch Map. US Geological Survey, 1967.
 Antarctic Digital Database (ADD). Scale 1:250000 topographic map of Antarctica. Scientific Committee on Antarctic Research (SCAR). Since 1993, regularly upgraded and updated.

References

Hills of Ellsworth Land
Thurston Island